John Marshall "Jack" Ford (May 18, 1947 – March 21, 2015) was an American Democratic politician who served as the mayor of Toledo, Ohio, from January 2002 to January 2006. Ford was Toledo's first African-American mayor.

Biography
A graduate of Ohio State University, Jack Ford received his master's degree in public administration and his law degree from the University of Toledo. He spent most of his working life as an educator, teaching primarily at the University of Toledo for 22 years, but also at Bowling Green State University and Owens Community College.

Ford served in the Ohio House of Representatives for seven years, and was Democratic leader of the Ohio House for the final three. He was a speaker at the 2000 Democratic National Convention. Ford served on the Toledo City Council. In November 2001, he was elected Toledo mayor, replacing another Democrat, Carty Finkbeiner who, four years later, on November 8, 2005, was returned to office, defeating Ford in his re-election bid.

On March 7, 2006, media reports revealed that Ford would be returning to Bowling Green State University as a practitioner-in-residence in the College of Arts and Sciences effective March 13, 2006. According to reports, Ford will mostly teach in the department of political science.

In June 2007, Ford was selected to fill a vacancy on the Toledo Board of Education.

In his public career as a legislator and city executive, Jack Ford was responsible for the creation of the Toledo Youth Commission, the lead abatement program, the medication education for the elderly program, the Toledo curfew law, and the drug paraphernalia law.

He founded two organizations dealing with drug and alcohol addiction.

He was also a member of Omega Psi Phi fraternity.

Ford died the morning of March 21, 2015 at the age of 67.

References

External links
 Website of the City of Toledo

1947 births
Ohio State University alumni
University of Toledo alumni
Bowling Green State University faculty
University of Toledo faculty
African-American academics
Educators from Ohio
African-American state legislators in Ohio
African-American mayors in Ohio
Mayors of Toledo, Ohio
Place of birth missing
Ohio city council members
School board members in Ohio
Democratic Party members of the Ohio House of Representatives
2015 deaths
Politicians from Springfield, Ohio
21st-century American politicians
21st-century African-American politicians
20th-century African-American people